Hopea sangal is a tree in the family Dipterocarpaceae. It is native to tropical Asia.

Description
It has buttresses. The bark is cracked and scaly.

Distribution and habitat
Hopea sangal is native to Thailand, Peninsular Malaysia, Singapore, Sumatra, Borneo, Java and Bali. In the Kalimantan region of Borneo, ectomycorrhizal (symbiotic) relationships with this species have been reported.

Conservation
Hopea sangal has been assessed as vulnerable on the IUCN Red List. It is threatened by land conversion for agriculture and palm oil plantations. It is also threatened by logging for its timber. The species is found in some protected areas.

References

sangal
Flora of Thailand
Flora of Malesia
Plants described in 1841
Taxonomy articles created by Polbot